B. laevis may refer to:

 Balanus laevis, a barnacle species in the genus Balanus
 Barbichthys laevis, the sucker barb, a ray-finned fish species
 Bidens laevis, the bur-marigold or smooth beggartick, a flowering plant species native to the southern half of the United States

See also
 List of Latin and Greek words commonly used in systematic names#L